Harold Maurice Miller (February 4, 1930 – November 21, 2011) was an American football player.  He played professionally as a tackle for the San Francisco 49ers of the National Football League (NFL) in 1953.

Playing career
Miller attended Dobyns-Bennett High School in Kingsport, Tennessee where he was selected as a 1948 Wigwam Wiseman High School Football All-American.

Miller played college football at the Georgia Institute of Technology and was a two time All-Southeastern Conference selection and a consensus All-American in 1952, when he led Georgia Tech Yellow Jackets as co-captain to a national championship. He played in the 1953 College All-Star Game. Miller is a member of the Georgia Tech Athletic Hall of Fame, Georgia Sports Hall of Fame, Tennessee Sports Hall of Fame, NEC Sports Hall of Fame and the Dobyns-Bennett High School Alumni Hall of Fame.

Miller was selected in the fifth round of the 1953 NFL Draft. He died aged 81 on November 21, 2011.

References

External links
 

1930 births
2011 deaths
American football tackles
Georgia Tech Yellow Jackets football players
San Francisco 49ers players
All-American college football players
People from Kingsport, Tennessee
Players of American football from Tennessee